Kjell Ingemar Öhman (3 September 1943 – 5 November 2015) was a notable Swedish jazz musician. He worked as band leader, musical director and arranger of music albums, and of TV programs, among them Notknäckarna, Allsång på Skansen (1994–2010), Hasse och hans vänner and Café Luleå.

Öhman appeared in more than 3000 albums and worked with musicians, among them The Telstars, Marcus Österdahl, Alice Babs, Georgie Fame, Charlie Norman, Svend Asmussen, Arne Domnérus, Simons, Ulf Wakenius, Rune Gustafsson, Hans Backenroth and Ulf Lundell.

In 2006 Öhman received the Jan Johansson Scholarship.

Discography
2012: The Duke

References

External links
Kjell Öhman on Allsång på Skansen's website (written in 2008)
Notice of death'
In memoriam

1943 births
2015 deaths
Swedish jazz musicians
Swedish conductors (music)
Male conductors (music)
20th-century pianists
20th-century Swedish musicians
21st-century pianists
21st-century Swedish musicians
20th-century conductors (music)
20th-century Swedish male musicians
21st-century Swedish male musicians